The 2021 LET Access Series was a series of professional women's golf tournaments held from June through October 2021 across Europe. The LET Access Series is the second-tier women's professional golf tour in Europe and is the official developmental tour of the Ladies European Tour.

Tournament results
The table below shows the 2021 schedule. The numbers in brackets after the winners' names show the number of career wins they had on the LET Access Series up to and including that event.

Order of Merit rankings
The top six players on the LETAS Order of Merit earn LET membership of the Ladies European Tour for the 2022 season. Players finishing in positions 7–20 get to skip the first stage of the qualifying event and automatically progress to the final stage of the Lalla Aicha Tour School.

See also
2021 Ladies European Tour
2021 in golf

References

External links

LET Access Series seasons
LET Access Series
LET Access Series